The Men's Individual large hill/10 km at the FIS Nordic World Ski Championships 2011 was held on 2 March 2011. The ski jumping part of the event took place at 11:00 CET while the cross country part took place at 16:00 CET. Bill Demong of the United States was both the defending world and Olympic champion.

Results

Ski jumping

Cross-country skiing

References

FIS Nordic World Ski Championships 2011